Xanthi (Xánthi) is a city in the region of Western Thrace, northeastern Greece. It is the capital of the Xanthi regional unit of the region of East Macedonia and Thrace.

Amphitheatrically built on the foot of Rhodope mountain chain, the city is divided by the Kosynthos River, into the west part, where the old and the modern town are located, and the east part that boasts a rich natural environment. The "Old Town of Xanthi" is known throughout Greece for its distinctive architecture, combining many Byzantine Greek churches with neoclassical mansions of Greek merchants from the 18th and 19th centuries and Ottoman-Era mosques. Other landmarks in Xanthi include the Archaeological Museum of Abdera and the Greek Folk Art Museum.

Xanthi is famous throughout Greece (especially Macedonia and Thrace) for its annual spring carnival (Greek: καρναβάλι) which has a significant role in the city's economy. Over 40 cultural associations from around Greece participate in the carnival program. The festivities which take place during the period include concerts, theatre plays, music and dance nights, exhibitions, a cycling event, games on the streets, and re-enactments of old customs.

Name
There are two theories regarding the origin of its name: it was either named after a daughter of Oceanus and Tethys, or after Xanthi, one of the Amazons that ruled the region, according to legend.

Xanthi is known as "İskeçe" in Turkish and "Скеча" (Skecha) or "Ксанти" (Ksanti) in Bulgarian.

History
Xanthi is sometimes identified with the ancient city of Xantheia mentioned in the 1st century BC by the geographer Strabo, but it was not mentioned by any other ancient historian. It began as a small village and experienced all the tumultuous periods of the history of Thrace, such as raids, disasters, ethnic conflicts, civil wars. The population of the region of Xanthi had dwindled down to almost nothing, as the region was depopulated in the 3rd century AD and almost everything had been destroyed when the Ottomans conquered the region in 1361. For this reason, the Ottomans brought settlers from within of Asia Minor, which is how Genisea (Γενισέα) was created, while Oraio (Ωραίο) and Xanthi remained mainly Greek and Christian centres.

Middle Ages
Known references to Xanthi, or Xanthia, the city's origins are obscure; it was a prosperous stronghold of the Byzantine era but latter became a colony of the Ottomans known as Eskije. Xanthi is first recorded in 879 (Bishop Georgios of Xantheia is reported as taking part in the Fourth Council of Constantinople).
From the 13th to the 14th century it was the most important city of the region. Three monasteries date from the Middle Ages: Pammegiston, Taxiarchon, and Panagia Archangeliotisa, although written records indicate several others now lost.
Xanthi featured in the campaign of Andronikos II Palaiologos in 1327.

Early modern

By 1715, Xanthi, as well as Genisea, became renowned for its tobacco quality. Many foreign sightseers traveled throughout the region and described both the life and struggles of the locals. The tobacco trade throughout Europe led Xanthi into a course of prosperity. George Demetriou was active in the Xanthi area during the Greek Revolution of 1821. In March and April 1829 two earthquakes leveled the city, however, they played a decisive role in the further developments as the city's rebuilding immediately got underway. In 1870, the city of Genisea was burned down and thus all of the agencies and services were transferred to Xanthi which, at that time, had a population of about 10,000 inhabitants. In 1891, a rail line was established near the city, while further economic development led to the founding of schools and associations. During the late period of Ottoman rule until 1912, the city was administratively located in the Sanjak of Gümülcine within the Adrianople Vilayet.

Balkan Wars
During the First Balkan War, Xanthi was captured by the Bulgarian army from the Ottomans in 8 November 1912. In the Second Balkan War the Greek army captured it in July 1913. However, with the Treaty of Bucharest, Xanthi along with Western Thrace were ceded to Bulgaria (where it was also called  Skecha), and remained a part of the latter until the end of World War I. Following the Bulgarian defeat in this war, Western Thrace came under Allied administration and on 4 October 1919 the Greek army under Georgios Leonardopoulos command entered the city. That date is today celebrated in Xanthi as the anniversary of its liberation. Second lieutenant Gavriel Ladas, who was from Xanthi, led the first Greek troops in the city. Ladas became the mayor of Xanthi from 1959 to 1964.

World War II

On 8 April 1941 the 164th Infantry Division captured Xanthi following the German invasion of Greece and the Germans passed the city to Bulgaria, who occupied the whole region east of Strymonas, except a small German zone near the border with Turkey. The city became the administrative center of the Bulgarian province of Belomorie and served as headquarters for the Bulgarian Second Army. During the Bulgarian occupation, more than 2,000 men from Xanthi, both Christians and Muslims were sent for forced labor in Bulgaria. On 4 March 1943 the Jews of Xanthi were arrested by the Bulgarians and imprisoned in a tobacco warehouse. On 18 and 19 March, they were deported to Nazi concentration camps in Poland. From a community of 550 people, only six Jews survived the Holocaust. The synagogue of Xanthi built in 1926 at the corner of Hatzistavrou and Anatolikis Thrakis streets, was used by Christian Associations and later abandoned. It was sold and demolished in 1995. The city was liberated following the 9 September coup d'etat in Bulgaria when partisans of the Greek People's Liberation Army entered the city and took over control without a fight. However, the Bulgarian army remained in the region until the end of October 1944 and it withdrew under pressure from the Allies.

Today 

Nowadays Xanthi is a modern city, rich in history, traditions and customs, and with many attractions for the visitors (including the surrounding areas). Xanthi is known as the city of a thousand colours, and like Komotini (Gümülcine) and Didymoteicho (Dimetoka) has a large population of Turkish-speaking Muslims. The Muslim population of East Macedonia and Thrace dates to the Ottoman period, and unlike the Turkish Muslims and Greek Muslims of Greek Macedonia and Crete was exempted from the 1922–23 Greek-Turkish population exchange following the Treaty of Lausanne. In 1972 the Greek authorities planned to demolish the landmark of the city, the clock tower, built by Pomak Hadji Emin Aga in 1870. This decision resulted in protests by the local Muslims and the plans were cancelled.

Transport

Road Transport

A few kilometers outside Xanthi, the Egnatia Motorway crosses Xanthi with Macedonia, Epirus and the rest of Thrace. The Xanthi Bus Station runs daily services to several cities throughout Greece. Xanthi is 206 km from Thessaloniki, 704 km from Athens, 397 km from Istanbul and 236 km from Edirne. On January 15, 2010, the Agios Konstantinos border crossing point between Greece and Bulgaria was inaugurated, 51 km from Xanthi, linking the nearby village of Thermi with the town of Zlatograd. Under construction is the vertical cross-border axis of Egnatia Road, which will connect Xanthi with the Bulgarian town of Rudozem.

Rail Transport

Outside Xanthi is the Xanthi railway station on the Thessaloniki-Alexandroupoli line, with daily services to Thessaloniki and Alexandroupolis.

Air Transport

Xanthi does not have an airport. It is mainly served by Kavala Airport, 42 km away, and secondarily by Alexandroupolis Airport, 112 km away.

Municipality 
The municipality Xanthi was formed at the 2011 local government reform by the merger of the following 2 former municipalities, that became municipal units:
Stavroupoli
Xanthi

The municipality has an area of 495.118 km2, the municipal unit 153.116 km2.

Communities
The municipal unit Xanthi is subdivided into the communities Evmoiro, Kimmeria and Xanthi. These communities contain the following settlements:
Evmoiro
Kallithea
Lamprino
Lefki
Nea Morsini
Palaia Morsini
Petrochori
Kimmeria
Gialisteri
Livadi
Pelekito
the abandoned villages Alikochori, Anthiro, Askyra, Eranos, Ketiki, Porta, Prioni and Ydrochori
Xanthi

Economy
Traditionally, the tobacco business, commerce, and farming have been the primary occupation of the residents of the area. During the last decades, tourism has also increased, especially during the period of the "festivals of the old town".

Population

Education 
 Democritus University of Thrace
School of Engineering 
Department of Electrical and Computer Engineering
Department of Civil Engineering
Department of Environmental Engineering
Department of Architectural Engineering
Department of Production Management Engineering

Cultural events

Carnival and old town's festivals

The city has a rich history, tradition, and customs and it is the cultural center in the area. It is also considered a multi-cultural city and it has been characterized as "the city of the thousand colours". Xanthi's Carnival is very popular (every February) and is one of the most popular in Greece, while the "old town festival" (early September) is equally famous. Furthermore, the bazaar of Xanthi is famous and takes place at Emboriou Square every Saturday. In addition, the Manos Hatzidakis' festival attracts worldwide interest.

Museums

Folklore and Historical Museum of Xanthi
Εcclesiastical Museum Metropolis of Xanthi
Municipal Gallery of Xanthi
Museum of Natural History
Foundation of Thracian Art and Tradition
Museum of the History of the Greek Costume
Tobacco Museum
Manos Hadjidakis House

Sports

Xanthi FC, plays in the Super League Greece 2
Xanthi BC, played in the Greek A2 League
Aspida Xanthi, football (one appearance in the First League) and basketball
Orfeas Xanthi FC, football
Orion Xanthi, basketball

Famous people from Xanthi 

 Manos Hadjidakis (1925–1994): Major Greek composer. Winner of the Academy Award for Best Original Song for his song Never on Sunday from the film of the same name.
 Şerif Gören: Turkish film director. Winner of 1982 Palme d'Or in Cannes Film Festival
 Yanaki Paskalev (1863–1933): Bulgarian revolutionary, member of IMORO
 Archbishop Christodoulos (1939–2008): former Archbishop of the Greek Orthodox Church
 Vasilis Torosidis: football player for Olympiacos F.C. and the Greece national football team
 Lambros Papantoniou (Mandra, Xanthi 1945-Washington, USA 2009): journalist, political analyst.
 Zafeiris Melas, contemporary Greek laïko singer.
 Çiğdem Asafoğlu, The Party of Friendship, Equality and Peace General President

International relations

Xanthi is twinned with:
 Smolyan, Bulgaria
 Novi Beograd, Serbia
 Gifhorn, Lower Saxony, Germany
 Biga, Turkey (since 2000)
 Bursa, Turkey
 Adra, Spain

Gallery

See also
Xanthi (regional unit)
Eastern Macedonia and Thrace
Thrace
Western Thrace
Xanthi Carnival

References

 Messinas, E. (2022). The Synagogues of Greece: A Study of Synagogues in Macedonia and Thrace: With Architectural Drawings of all Synagogues of Greece. Seattle: KDP, pp. 133-144 and 197-199. .
 Μεσσίνας, Η. (2022). H Συναγωγή, Αθήνα: Εκδόσεις Ινφογνώμων, pp. 19-36. 
 Μεσσίνας, Η. (1999). Oι Συναγωγές στην Ελλάδα, η αρχιτεκτονική τους και η σχέση τους με τον ιστό της πόλης και την εβραϊκή συνοικία: Συγκριτική μελέτη της ιστορίας και αρχιτεκτονικής των συναγωγών της Βορείου Ελλάδος, η θέση τους στην εβραϊκή συνοικία και η παρουσία τους στον πολεοδομικό ιστό από τον 15ο στον 20ο αιώνα. Διδακτορική διατριβή στο Τμήμα Αρχιτεκτόνων Μηχανικών Τομέα Πολεοδομίας και Χωροταξίας του ΕΜΠ, pp. 239-254.

External links
The old town of Xanthi – 3D Reconstruction
Democritus University of Thrace
Municipality of Xanthi
Thrace the land of Orpheus – Democritus University of Thrace
Cultural and Educational Technology Institute

 
Populated places in Xanthi (regional unit)
Greek prefectural capitals
Municipalities of Eastern Macedonia and Thrace